Michael Boris Guthörl (born 26 January 1999) is a German-Ghanaian professional footballer who plays as a right-back for Rot-Weiß Koblenz.

Career
Guthörl made his professional debut for Wehen Wiesbaden on 11 August 2019 in the first round of the 2019–20 DFB-Pokal, coming on as a substitute for Nicklas Shipnoski in the 102nd minute of extra time against 1. FC Köln. The match went to a penalty shoot-out following a 3–3 draw, in which Guthörl had his shot saved by Timo Horn, with Wiesbaden ultimately losing 3–2 on penalties.

References

External links
 
 

1999 births
Living people
Footballers from Accra
German footballers
Ghanaian footballers
German sportspeople of Ghanaian descent
Association football fullbacks
SpVgg Greuther Fürth II players
SV Wehen Wiesbaden players
TSG 1899 Hoffenheim II players
FC Rot-Weiß Koblenz players
2. Bundesliga players
3. Liga players
Regionalliga players